Wade Hampton Griffin Jr. (born August 7, 1954) is a former American football offensive tackle in the National Football League. He was signed by the Baltimore Colts as an undrafted free agent in 1977. He played college football at Mississippi.

1954 births
Living people
American football offensive tackles
Ole Miss Rebels football players
Baltimore Colts players
People from Winona, Mississippi